Bret "Hollywood" Freeman (born September 15, 1966 in Harbor City, Los Angeles) is an American/British MMA ring announcer. He works for many major Boxing and MMA promotions across Europe and the Middle East including Goodwin Promotions, Matchroom, Cage Rage UK's Ultimate Challenge, Cage Warriors, Cage Contender, IFPA and others.  He is known for his flamboyant dress and his trademark catch phrase "It's Go Time".  He has been seen on live and pre-recorded televised MMA events in more than 70 countries.

Announcing career 
Freeman started his announcing career in 2009, for small, regional MMA shows in the United Kingdom. His first job was with KAYO MMA, a promotion based in Watford, England. From there, he was contracted to Bushido Challenge, then MMA Clinic. His big break came in 2010, for one of the UK's largest MMA organisations, Ultimate Challenge. in 2013, he was licensed by the British Boxing Board of Control and began announcing for BBBofC Boxing events.
He changed his stage name to Bret Hollywood in 2014.  

He then regularly worked for UCMMA, Cage Warriors, Cage Contender and International Fighting & Promotions Alliance. 

Bret has provided the following services across various promotions:
 Matchroom Boxing
 Matchroom Snooker
 Goodwin Promotions
IFPA MMA- International Fighting & Promotions Alliance -Ring Announcer/MC -Presenter
 Ultimate Challenge MMA -Ring Announcer/MC
 Cage Contender -Ring Announcer/MC
 Cage Warriors -Ring Announcer/MC -Presenter
 OMMAC -Ring Announcer/MC 
 London KO -Ring Announcer/MC -presenter
 KnuckleUp -Ring Announcer/MC
 MMA Clinic -Ring Announcer/MC -presenter
 Bushido Challenge -Ring Announcer/MC -presenter
 KAYO MMA -Ring Announcer/MC -presenter
 BAMMA -Commentator and post production voice over
 MMA Clinic -Commentator
 Bushido Challenge -Commentator
 Trojan MMA -Commentator
 KnuckleUp -Commentator
 KAYO MMA -Commentator
 Miss Great Britain -MC

Trademark 
Bret began using "It's Go Time" to introduce the main event early in 2010, and was awarded a trademark by the World International Patent Office in November 2010.  His work in Sports communication and trademark efforts have been noted by ESPN and in Strategic Sports Communication 2nd Edition by Pedersen, Paul M., Laucella, Pamela, Kian, Edward, Geurin, Andrea.   Late in 2014 Bret moved away from this trademark.

Television work 
Freeman hosts the weekly Sports Tonight Live MMA magazine show, "The Cage", has presented several local MMA programmes for LA Muscle and the Active Channel (including "KAYO MMA") and was a featured colour commentator on Bravo for BAMMA.

He was a frequent guest on the My Channel MMA Lifestyle show, Wartime TV in the UK. He was a part of their feature, "Hollywood Cribs", which documented a tour of his home in Buckinhamshire, England.

Freeman was a featured character on Sky Atlantic series The Guest Wing.

Bret Hollywood (Freeman) was featured on the Channel 4 series Come Dine With Me.

Freeman and his wife Julia have been featured on the Sky Sports MMA talk show, Cage Fighter.

As resident ring announcer for Cage Rage UK, Ultimate Challenge MMA, Bret was part of the first UK-based pay-per-view event, Cage Rage UK Presents Ultimate Challenge, Warriors Creed: Alex Reid vs Jason Barrett, which was shown live on Premier Sports, 7 August 2011.

References

External links 
 www.hollywoodmc.com
 

1966 births
Living people
Sportspeople from Los Angeles
Mixed martial arts people
People from Harbor City, Los Angeles